Chris Osborne may also refer to:

Chris Osborne (golfer) in Kentucky Open
Chris Osborne (musician) on Garland Jeffreys (album)